BC Kutaisi 2010 is a Georgian professional basketball club, which competes in the Georgian Superliga.

It is based in Kutaisi, the legislative capital of Georgia.

Honours

Current roster

Record

References

External links
 https://basketball.eurobasket.com/team/Georgia/Kutaisi-2010/2548

Basketball teams in Georgia (country)
Georgian Superliga